Dimitrios Manos (born 16 September 1994) is a Greek professional footballer who plays as a forward for Super League club Ionikos, on loan from Bandırmaspor.

Club career

Veria
Manos started his professional career in Veria. His first professional contract was signed on 22 June 2012 and its set to expire on 30 June 2017. He made his debut for Veria in a 3–0 away defeat against Olympiacos on 6 January 2013.

On 7 October 2014, Manos was called up by Kostas Tsanas, the head coach of Greece national under-21 football team to join the training sessions of the team.

Manos returned to Veria on 20 January 2016 after a six months spell to Ergotelis on loan.

Manos was released on a free transfer by the club on 2 July 2016.

Loan to Ergotelis
On 31 August 2015, Manos moved on loan for a season to Ergotelis. He debuted for Ergotelis in the first round of the 2015–16 Football League in a home match against fellow Cretan club AO Chania. He then went on to score his first goal in his second appearance for the club in the next match against Acharnaikos in Menidi, scoring in the 88th minute and thus helping the club earn its first victory in the competition. Manos was released by the Cretan club before his loan ended; in January 2016 the club announced its withdrawal from professional competitions. Manos completed his loan spell as club top scorer at the time, having played in 18 matches in which he had scored 6 goals. Despite reported interest from other Football League clubs, Manos could not feature for any other clubs that season, due to a single appearance with Veria at the very start of the season. As a result, Manos returned to Veria and was made part of the club's roster.

OFI
On 1 July 2016, Manos moved for a season to OFI for an undisclosed fee. On 19 December 2016, he scored his first goal in a 2–1 away win against Kallithea. On 26 February 2017, he scored a brace in a 2–0 home win against Kissamikos. On 12 March 2017, he scored in a 3–0 away win against Panelefsiniakos. On 26 March 2017, his goal gave his team an important 1–0 home win against Kallithea. He finished the 2016–17 season with 10 goals and 5 assists. He started the 2017–18 season providing back up for the team's main striker, Nikos Kouskounas. After the departure of Kouskounas he became the first-choice striker and made an immediate impact scoring 10 goals in 8 matches. On 17 February 2018, he scored a brace in a 3–0 away win against Sparti, which restored the team to the second place of the league table, in the battle for promotion. On 3 March 2018 he scored the only goal in a home win against Anagennisi Karditsa.

The 24-year-old has made some fantastic performances so far, scoring 15 goals and giving 6 assists and therefore has attracted interest. Two of the teams said to be interested in his signature are Olympiacos, who have been keeping tabs on him for quite some time and Panathinaikos who really need a striker having tough luck with many injuries at that position. Reports say that the greens offered OFI €100,000 in order to sign Manos in the beginning of the window. As well in the hunt are PAS Giannina and Xanthi. Just one day after these rumors Manos scored in a 3–1 away win against Kallithea and the administration of OFI expressed their desire to extend his contract. On 31 March 2018, opened the score a penalty when Nikos Boutzikos’ arm blocked a set-piece, and scored one more goal as his club made another huge step towards promotion to the Superleague, defeating 3–0 nearest challengers Panachaiki. On 4 April 2018, Manos scored by sliding the ball into the net at point blank range after a wonderful combination play, opening the score in a 2–0 derby home win against rivals Aris. The Thessaloniki club came into the match protecting an unbeaten record, but Aris were swept aside by a powerful OFI. On 26 April 2018, he scored his first career hat-trick and was sent-off in an emphatic 7–0 home win against Panegialios, setting a new record for the club for goals scored in the season for the Cretan side. The record was previously held by Costarican striker Rónald Gómez, who scored 19 goals during the 1999–2000 campaign. On 5 May 2018, he scored a brace against Apollon Larissa in an emphatic 4–0 home game.
OFI's striker might not be with the club come the new season as he is rumored to a move to giants Olympiacos in the summer.

Olympiacos
In April 2018, Manos signed with Olympiacos for an initial fee of €200,000. On 27 September 2018, in his debut with the club was the only scorer with a header in a 1–0 Greek Cup home win game against Levadiakos. On 29 October 2018, Lazaros Christodoulopoulos’ surge into the box ended with his shot ricocheting fortuitously into the path of the young striker, who finished enabling his club to edge out bottom club Apollon Smyrnis 1–0 at the Karaiskakis Stadium.

Loan to PAS Giannina
On 16 January 2019, Manos was often left out of the squad by Pedro Martins during the first half of the season. To his credit, the 24-year old did manage to score two goals in nine appearances across all competitions with Olympiacos, but he has now been loaned out to PAS Giannina for the remainder of the current season. On 26 January 2019, in his debut with the club, he scored with an early sixth-minute goal, sealing a 1–0 win game against Apollon Smyrnis. On 30 March 2019, he scored an acrobatic goal from the top of the penalty area in a 2–0 away win against rivals Levadiakos in his club's effort to avoid relegation.

Loan to OFI
On 2 July 2019, Manos was not in the plans of Pedro Martins for the upcoming season, so has been loaned out to his former club OFI for the 2019–20 season.
On 31 August 2019, he scored a brace, the first after an assist from Kosmas Tsilianidis, beating Sokratis Dioudis with a clinical finish and the second after an error by Portuguese defender João Nunes in a 3–1 away win against Panathinaikos.

Aris
On 12 August 2020, Manos signed a two-year contract with Aris on a free transfer. On 2 December 2020, he scored a brace in an emphatic 3–0 away win against AEL.

On 7 March 2021, he scored in a 2–2 away draw against PAOK in the traditional Derby of Thessaloniki. On 18 April 2021, Manos scored in a 2–1 away win against Panathinaikos, redeeming himself for a missed penalty earlier in the first half. On 5 May 2021, he opened the score in an eventual 1–1 home draw against Olympiacos.

International career
Manos debuted for Greece U21 on 7 September 2015 in a 2–0 away win against Liechtenstein U21 as he came in replacing Savvidis at 86' minute.

Career statistics

Honours

Club
OFI
Football League: 2017–18

Individual
Football League top scorer: 2017–18 (27 goals)

References

External links

1988 births
Living people
Greek footballers
Greece under-21 international footballers
Super League Greece players
Football League (Greece) players
Veria F.C. players
Ergotelis F.C. players
OFI Crete F.C. players
Olympiacos F.C. players
PAS Giannina F.C. players
Aris Thessaloniki F.C. players
Association football forwards
People from Imathia
Footballers from Central Macedonia